Ezra Weeks, was a successful builder who served as a witness in a sensationalized murder trial.

Ezra Weeks had allied himself with the mercantile elite and had made powerful connections. His brother, Levi Weeks, was a carpenter by trade who worked closely with Ezra. The Weeks brothers’ main building project at the time was Hamilton Grange, a country house in Harlem Heights in Upper Manhattan. Alexander Hamilton was having a country seat built to rival Richmond Hill, the country home of his nemesis Aaron Burr. John McComb, the architect of Hamilton Grange, and Ezra Weeks would both be key defense witnesses for Ezra Weeks' brother, Levi in one of the most sensational murder trials of the turn of the 18th century.

Ezra Weeks was an object of curiosity within New York City society circles. Only a few years prior to being commissioned by Hamilton, he and his brother Levi were living at the corner of Greenwich and Harrison streets.  On March 1, 1800, Levi was tried for the murder of Gulielma Sands. Ezra was the principal witness for Hamilton's defense.

Weeks was a member of St. John's Lodge (New York), having affiliated in 1796.

Ezra Weeks worked with John McComb Jr. in the construction of Gracie Mansion (1799) and Hamilton Grange (1802).

References

Sources 
 Stern, Ellen Stock. 2005. Gracie Mansion: a celebration of New York City's mayoral residence. New York, NY: Rizzoli.

19th-century American businesspeople
American construction businesspeople
Businesspeople from New York City